Mindscape was a video game developer and publisher. The company was founded by Roger Buoy in October 1983 in Northbrook, Illinois, originally as part of SFN Companies until a management buyout was completed in 1987. Mindscape went public in 1988 and was subsequently acquired in 1990 by The Software Toolworks, eyeing Mindscape's Nintendo license. When Toolworks was acquired by Pearson plc in 1994, Mindscape became the primary identity for the development group. Mindscape was then sold to The Learning Company in 1998 and bought out by Jean-Pierre Nordman in 2001, becoming headquartered in Boulogne-Billancourt, France. Following the poor performance of its products, Mindscape exited the video game industry in August 2011. Notable titles released by Mindscape include the MacVenture series, Balance of Power, Moonstone: A Hard Days Knight, Legend, Warhammer: Shadow of the Horned Rat, Warhammer: Dark Omen and Lego Island.

History

Early years (1983–1988) 
Mindscape was founded in October 1983 as a wholly owned subsidiary of holding company SFN Companies. Mindscape's founder, Australian entrepreneur Roger Buoy, had previously been a computer analyst for Rolls-Royce Limited and later worked for the software division of Scholastic Inc., before being hired by SFN in October 1983 to set up Mindscape. For Mindscape, Buoy acted as president and chief executive officer (CEO). Mindscape released its first product in April 1984. Early games published by the company include Déjà Vu, Balance of Power, and Sub Mission: A Matter of Life and Death. In its early years, Mindscape lost about  annually.

In July 1986, Mindscape acquired the assets of Scarborough Systems, a software company from Tarrytown, New York. Scarborough Systems continued its operations through Lifeboat Assoc., a subsidiary that was not acquired by Mindscape. In October, SFN announced that it would be selling or closing large parts of its business, including plans to liquidate Mindscape. On December 31, Mindscape also acquired the assets of Roslyn, New York-based company Learning Well. Because Mindscape was not liquidated by the end of 1986, it was assigned to SFN Partners L.P., a limited partnership company. Buoy retained his positions in the company, while Purcell became its chairman. At this point, Mindscape had 74 employees.

In March 1987, Mindscape acquired the software division of Holt, Rinehart and Winston formerly known as CBS Interactive Learning, with all operations moved to Mindscape's Northbrook, Illinois, headquarters. By June 1988, Mindscape filed with the U.S. Securities and Exchange Commission to prepare an initial public offering (IPO) and become a public company. The IPO was completed that same month, with the company commencing trading over-the-counter, and the first shares were issued by July. Bob Ingersoll and Dennis O'Malley were appointed vice president (VP) of marketing and VP of sales, respectively, in May 1987. Robert A. Drell, formerly of Dresher Inc., became VP of finance and chief financial officer in October 1988.

Under The Software Toolworks and Pearson (1989–1997) 
In December 1989, video game company The Software Toolworks reached an agreement to acquire Mindscape, exchanging every Mindscape share for 0.4375 of a share in newly issued Toolworks common stock. Mindscape had been one of the approximately forty companies licensed to develop for Nintendo video game platforms, which was a major reason for the acquisition. The two companies merged, and Buoy joined Les Crane on Toolworks' company board. Following the acquisition, Mindscape became Toolwork's division working exclusively on games for Nintendo platforms, which sharply increased Toolwork's earnings.

Pearson was criticized for overpaying in the acquisition, and the acquired company lost  in its early years under Pearson. By November 1994, Toolworks had assumed the Mindscape identity. The same year, Mindscape acquired video game developer Strategic Simulations. In September 1995, it acquired Micrologic Software from Emeryville, California, to undisclosed terms. In January 1996, John F. Moore became CEO after leaving the same position at Western Publishing. In November, it laid off twelve developed staff as a cost reduction measure. In 1997, Mindscape acquired software company Multimedia Design. In its final year under Pearson, 1997, Mindscape become profitable again, generating .

Under The Learning Company and later years (1998–2011) 
A waiting period was temporarily imposed by the Federal Trade Commission and subsequently terminated the same month. Later that year, when TLC integrated its Broderbund division, Mindscape took over Broderbund's productivity, reference and entertainment brands. TLC would be eventually acquired by Mattel in May 1999 and became a subsidiary of the company's Mattel Media division, later renamed Mattel Interactive. By then, Mattel occasionally used the Mindscape name for publishing.

TLC and Mattel Interactive's gaming assets were acquired by Gores Technology Group in 2000 and its game brands were reformed under a new entity, Game Studios, in January 2001. The same year, former TLC-Edusoft executive Jean-Pierre Nordman bought out Mindscape from TLC, installing it as a separate entity in Boulogne-Billancourt, a suburb of Paris, France, and assuming a managerial role.

In October 2005, French video game developer and publisher Coktel Vision was sold to Mindscape, wherein eleven Coktel employees were absorbed into Mindscape. The Coktel brand name, however, was retained by Mindscape many years afterwards; its history officially ended in 2011 when Mindscape closed.

By December 2009, Thierry Bensoussan had become the managing director for Mindscape. The company opened an internal development studio, Punchers Impact, in Paris to develop multi-platform digital download games. The studio's managers, Guillaume Descamps and Jérôme Amouyal, left the studio less than a year later, in September 2010, to found a new studio, Birdies Road. Punchers Impact developed two games—Crasher, a racing game, and U-Sing, a music game. U-Sing performed well at retail, but the cost of music licenses for the game had a severe impact on its revenue, while Crasher underperformed in general. As a result, Mindscape announced on August 10, 2011, that it had closed Punchers Impact and laid off its forty employees, while itself would effectively exit the video game industry. Some regional subsidiaries, such as Mindscape Asia-Pacific in Sydney, Australia, continued operating in the video game business as entities independent from Mindscape.

Software developed and/or published 

 Racter (1984)
 Balance of Power (1985)
 Deja Vu (1985)
 Mindscape Amiga Tutorial (1985), included on the Workbench 1.1 disk
 American Challenge: A Sailing Simulation (1986)
 Harrier Combat Simulator (1986)
 James Bond 007: Goldfinger (1986)
 TrailBlazer (1986)
 Uninvited (1986)
 Shadowgate (1987)
 Mavis Beacon Teaches Typing (1987)
 Road Runner (Commodore 64, MS-DOS) (United States, Canada) (1987)
 Visions of Aftermath: The Boomtown (PC) (1988)
 Willow (Amiga, Atari ST, Commodore 64, MS-DOS) (1988)
 The Colony (1988)
 Indiana Jones and the Temple of Doom (NES) (1988)
 Paperboy (NES, Game Boy, MS-DOS, Commodore 64) (1988, 1990)
 Fiendish Freddy's Big Top O'Fun (Amiga, ZX Spectrum, Commodore 64, Amstrad CPC) (1989)
 Prince of Persia (1989)
 Captive (1990)
 SimEarth (1990)
 Mad Max (NES) (1990)
 SimAnt (1991)
 Moonstone: A Hard Days Knight (1991)
 Knightmare (1991)
 Captain America and The Avengers (SNES + Handheld games ver.) (1991)
 Captain Planet and the Planeteers (1991)
 Gods (1991)
 D/Generation (1991)
 Contraption Zack (1992)
 SimLife (1992)
 Outlander (1992)
 The Terminator (NES) (1992)
 Legend (aka The Four Crystals of Trazere) (1992)
 Worlds of Legend: Son of the Empire (1993)
 Prince of Persia 2: The Shadow and the Flame (1993)
 Wing Commander (SNES) (1993)
 Super Battleship (1993)
 Star Wars Chess (1993)
 Metal Marines (1993)
 Dragon Lore: The Legend Begins (1994)
 Liberation: Captive 2 (Amiga, Amiga CD32) (1994)
 Aliens: A Comic Book Adventure (MS-DOS) (1995)
 Cyberspeed (PC [unreleased], PlayStation) (1995)
 Warhammer: Shadow of the Horned Rat (1995)
 Pool Champion (1995)
 Angel Devoid: Face of the Enemy (1996)
 Azrael's Tear (1996)
 Starwinder (1996)
 Steel Harbinger (1996)
 Counter Action (1997)
 Lego Island (PC) (1997)
 Aaron Vs. Ruth (1997)
 John Saul's Blackstone Chronicles (1998)
 Warhammer: Dark Omen (1998)
 Prince of Persia 3D (1999)
 Rat Attack! (1999)
 Billy Hatcher and the Giant Egg (PC) (2006)
 Golden Balls (2008)

References

External links 
 Mindscape at Giant Bomb
 Mindscape at MobyGames
 Mindscape at IGDB.co

Novato, California
Video game companies established in 1983
Video game companies disestablished in 2011
Defunct video game companies of the United States
Defunct video game companies of France
Video game development companies
Video game publishers
Mattel
1983 establishments in Illinois